In the Spirit is a 1990 American comedy film starring Marlo Thomas and Elaine May, directed by noted acting coach Sandra Seacat, with a screenplay co-authored by May's daughter Jeannie Berlin and Laurie Jones, both of whom also appear in the film.

Cast

Further reading
 May, Elaine. "FILM: She's a Beginner, but What Connections". The New York Times. (April 1, 1990), p. 15, p. 24
 Maslin, Janet. "Review/Film: A New-Age Comedy, Crystals And All". The New York Times. April 6, 1990.
 Benson, Sheila. "FILM REVIEW : 'Spirit' Loses Its Comic Flair Halfway Through". The Los Angeles Times. April 11, 1990.
 Kehr, Dave. "May And Thomas An Odd Couple In 'Spirit'". The Chicago Tribune. August 3, 1990.

External links
 
 
 
 "'In the Spirit' Promo" on YouTube

1990 films
1990s mystery comedy-drama films
American black comedy films
American mystery comedy-drama films
1990s black comedy films
Films scored by Patrick Williams
Films set in New York (state)
1990s English-language films
1990s American films